Ahmed Gomaa Ahmed Radwan is an Egyptian professor of Engineering Technology & Applied Sciences at the Faculty of Engineering, Cairo University, Egypt. He is an elected fellow of African Academy of Sciences, a senior member of  the Institute of Electrical and Electronics Engineers. He was a former center director of Nanoelectronics Integrated Systems Center of the Nile University, and Director of Technical Center for Career Development (TCCD), Cairo University. He is currently the Acting Head of Research & Sponsored Projects, Nile University, Egypt.

Education 
Ahmed Gomaa  Ahmed Radwan attended University of Cairo from B. SC to PhD level. He obtained his B. SC  degree in Electronics Communications in 1997. Two years later, He added a Diploma degree in Engineering Mathematics (1999) and bagged his M. Sc in Engineering Mathematics in 2002. He received his doctorate degree in Engineering Mathematics in 2006.

Awards and memberships 
In 2003, he won the best Master thesis prize (2001-2004) at the Faculty of Engineering-Cairo University, Egypt. In 2011, he won the 2nd best paper award in the international conference of microelectronics (ICM) in Tunis.  In 2012, he was awarded Senior IEEE membership. In the same year, he was awarded state achievement award. In 2013, he won the physical Sciences award in the 2013 International Publishing Competition by Misr El-Khair Institution  In the same year, he won Cairo University achievements award, In 2014, he was selected as a member in the first scientific council of the Egyptian Center for the Advancement of Science, Technology and Innovation (ECASTI). In 2016, he won Prof. Mohamed Amin Lotfy award.  in 2018, he received the state first class medal of science and arts and in 2019, he received the state excellence award and also won the scopus award in engineering and technology.

References 

Living people
Scientists from Cairo
Year of birth missing (living people)
Academic staff of Cairo University
Fellows of the African Academy of Sciences
Senior Members of the IEEE
Cairo University alumni
21st-century Egyptian engineers